Edwin Gyimah (born 9 March 1991) is a Ghanaian professional footballer who plays as a defender and midfielder for the Ghana national football team and Sekhukhune United.

Career

Club
Gyimah was born in Sekondi-Takoradi. Before joining SuperSport United in 2011, Gyimah played for All Stars and Sekondi Hasaacas in his home country. Gyimah left SuperSport in 2015 after 1 goal in 53 games, a spell that also included a loan to Mpumalanga Black Aces. After leaving SuperSport, he joined Orlando Pirates. Two years and 30 appearances followed before Gyimah left the club by mutual consent on 16 February 2017. He went on to play one season with Helsingborg in Superettan, the Swedish second tier, before returning to South Africa and Bidvest Wits in early 2018.

International
He made his international debut for Ghana in 2012.

Career statistics

Club
.

International
.

Honours

Club
SuperSport United
Nedbank Cup (1): 2011–12
Telkom Knockout (1): 2014

References

1991 births
Living people
People from Sekondi-Takoradi
Ghanaian footballers
Ghana international footballers
Association football defenders
Association football midfielders
Sekondi Hasaacas F.C. players
Legon Cities FC players
SuperSport United F.C. players
Mpumalanga Black Aces F.C. players
Orlando Pirates F.C. players
Helsingborgs IF players
Bidvest Wits F.C. players
Black Leopards F.C. players
Sekhukhune United F.C. players
Superettan players
South African Premier Division players
2015 Africa Cup of Nations players
2017 Africa Cup of Nations players
Ghanaian expatriate footballers
Ghanaian expatriate sportspeople in South Africa
Ghanaian expatriate sportspeople in Sweden
Expatriate soccer players in South Africa
Expatriate footballers in Sweden
Ghana A' international footballers
2011 African Nations Championship players